"On the Wings of a Nightingale" is a song written by Paul McCartney and recorded by the Everly Brothers in 1984 for their album EB 84, which Dave Edmunds produced.

Background
Paul McCartney had written the song specifically for the Everly Brothers and played guitar on the recording. The track was included as the first track on the duo's 1984 album EB 84. "On the Wings of a Nightingale" become their most popular song since 1970 and reached number 50 on the Billboard Hot 100.

Music video
The video made to accompany the song shows the brothers rescuing a classic car (specifically, a 1957 Chevrolet Bel Air convertible) from a junk yard, restoring it (in a series of shots that compress an unknown number of weeks, or months, into 35 seconds of video time) to drivable condition, then finally taking it out for a spin.

Charts

Cover versions
The Spongetones recorded a version for their 2000 Odd Fellows album. Apple Jam also recorded three versions for their 2012 On the Wings of a Nightingale EP.

McCartney's own version still exists, strictly as a demonstration recording; it remains unreleased as of 2020.

References

1984 songs
The Everly Brothers songs
Songs written by Paul McCartney
Mercury Records singles